The Rocky Flats Plant was a U.S. manufacturing complex that produced nuclear weapons parts in the western United States, near Denver, Colorado. The facility's primary mission was the fabrication of plutonium pits, which were shipped to other facilities to be assembled into nuclear weapons. Operated from 1952 to 1992, the complex was under the control of the U.S. Atomic Energy Commission (AEC), succeeded by the Department of Energy (DOE) in 1977.

Plutonium pit production was halted in 1989 after EPA and FBI agents raided the facility and the plant was formally shut down in 1992. Operators of the plant (Rockwell) later pleaded guilty to criminal violations of environmental law. At the time, the fine was one of the largest penalties ever in an environmental law case.

Cleanup began in the early 1990s, and the site achieved regulatory closure in 2006. Four groundwater treatment systems were also constructed. Today, the Rocky Flats Plant is gone. The site of the former facility consists of two distinct areas: (1) the "Central Operable Unit" (including the former industrial area), which remains off-limits to the public as a CERCLA "Superfund" site, owned and managed by the U.S. Department of Energy, and (2) the Rocky Flats National Wildlife Refuge, owned and managed by the U.S. Fish and Wildlife Service. The Refuge (also known as the "Peripheral Operable Unit") was determined to be suitable for unrestricted use. Every five years, the U.S. Department of Energy, U.S. Environmental Protection Agency, and Colorado Department of Public Health and Environment review environmental data and other information to assess whether the remedy is functioning as intended. The latest Five-Year Review for the site, released in August 2017, concluded the site remedy is protective of human health and the environment.

History

1950s
Following World War II, the United States increased production of nuclear weapons. The AEC chose the Dow Chemical Company to manage the production facility. On July 10, 1951, Ground was broken on the first building in the facility. Contemporary news reports stated that the site would not be used to produce nuclear bombs, but might be used to produce uranium and plutonium components for use in nuclear weapons.

In 1953, the plant began production of bomb components, manufacturing plutonium pits which were used at the Pantex plant in Amarillo, Texas to assemble fission weapons and the primary stages of thermonuclear weapons.  By 1957, the plant had expanded to 27 buildings.

On September 11, 1957, a plutonium fire occurred in one of the gloveboxes used to handle radioactive materials, igniting the combustible rubber gloves and plexiglas windows of the box. Metallic plutonium is a fire hazard and pyrophoric; under the right conditions it may ignite in air at room temperature.  The accident resulted in the contamination of Building 771, the release of plutonium into the atmosphere, and caused $818,600 in damage. An incinerator for plutonium-contaminated waste was installed in Building 771 in 1958.

1960s

Throughout the 1960s, the plant continued to enlarge and add buildings. The 1960s also brought more contamination to the site. In 1967,  of plutonium-contaminated lubricants and solvents had accumulated on Pad 903. A large number of them were found to be leaking, and low-level contaminated soil was becoming wind-borne from this area. At least some of the leakage had been detected as early as 1962. Later analysis completed in 1999 for the CDPHE estimated that between 6 and 58 Curies of plutonium spilled on to Pad 903 soil due to barrel leakage. This pad was covered with gravel and paved over with asphalt in 1969.

May 11, 1969 saw a major fire in a glovebox in Building 776/777.  This was the costliest industrial accident ever to occur in the United States up to that time. Cleanup from the accident took two years and led to safety upgrades on the site, including fire sprinkler systems and firewalls.

1970s
In order to reduce the danger of public contamination and to create a security area around the plant following protests, the United States Congress authorized the purchase of a  buffer zone around the plant in 1972. In 1973, nearby Walnut Creek (Colorado) and the Great Western Reservoir were found to have elevated tritium levels. The tritium was determined to have been released from contaminated materials shipped to Rocky Flats from the Lawrence Livermore Laboratory. Discovery of the contamination by the Colorado Department of Health led to investigations by the AEC and United States Environmental Protection Agency (EPA). As a result of the investigation, several mitigation efforts were put in place to prevent further contamination. Some of the elements included channeling of wastewater runoff to three dams for testing before release into the water system and construction of a reverse osmosis facility to clean up wastewater.

The next year, elevated plutonium levels were found in the topsoil near the now covered Pad 903. An additional  of buffer zone were purchased.

1975 saw Rockwell International replacing Dow Chemical as the contractor for the site. This year also saw local landowners suing for property contamination caused by the plant.

In 1978, 60 protesters belonging to the Rocky Flats Truth Force, or Satyagraha Affinity Group, based in Boulder, Colorado, were arrested for trespassing at Rocky Flats, and were brought to trial before Judge Kim Goldberger. Dr. John Candler Cobb, Professor of Preventive Medicine at the University of Colorado Medical Center, testified that the most significant danger of radioactive contamination came from the 1967 incident in which oil barrels containing plutonium leaked  of oil into sand under the barrels, which was then blown by strong winds as far away as Denver.

Dr. Carl Johnson, Jefferson County health director from 1973 to 1981, directed numerous studies on contamination levels and health risks the plant posed to public health. Based on his conclusions, Johnson opposed housing development near Rocky Flats. He was fired for opposing home development in contaminated areas. He later won a whistleblower lawsuit against Jefferson County, Colorado . Kristen Iversen, author of Full Body Burden: Growing Up in the Nuclear Shadow of Rocky Flats, contends later studies confirmed many of his findings.

In 1985, after hearing from various experts, the U.S. District Court for the District Court of Colorado found the results of Dr. Carl Johnson's study were "unreliable because the reported relationship seems implausible given the latency period for the types of cancer reported and because the excess cancers are different from the types of cancers expected to result from internally deposited plutonium." In addition, the court agreed with the Colorado State epidemiologist that "no measurable increases in cancer incidence resulting from operations at Rocky Flats have been demonstrated by any appropriate scientific method." Subsequent and ongoing studies indicate likely ongoing contamination and health issues. To date, there has never been an epidemiological study of people who lived or live near the Rocky Flats site.

On April 28, 1979, a few weeks after the Three Mile Island accident, a crowd of close to 15,000 protesters assembled at a nearby site. Singers Jackson Browne and Bonnie Raitt took the stage along with various speakers. The following day, 286 protesters including Daniel Ellsberg were arrested for civil disobedience/trespassing on the Rocky Flats facility.

1980s

On December 11, 1980, Congress enacted the Comprehensive Environmental Response, Compensation, and Liability Act, which provided the authority to respond directly to releases or threatened releases at the nation's worst environmental sites.

Dark Circle is a 1982 American documentary film that focuses on the Rocky Flats Plant and its plutonium contamination of the area's environment.  The film won the Grand Prize for documentary at the Sundance Film Festival and received a national Emmy Award for "Outstanding individual achievement in news and documentary".

Rocky Flats became a focus of protest by peace activists throughout the 1980s. In 1983, a demonstration was organized that brought together 17,000 people who joined hands in an encirclement around the  perimeter of the plant.

A perimeter security zone was installed around the facility in 1983 and was upgraded with remote detection abilities in 1985. Also in 1983, the first radioactive waste was processed through the aqueous recovery system, creating a plutonium button.

A celebration of 250,000 continuous safe hours by the employees at Rocky Flats happened in 1985. The same year, Rockwell received Industrial Research Magazine's IR-100 award for a process to remove actinide contamination from wastewater at the plant. The next year, the site received a National Safety Council Award of Honor for outstanding safety performance.

By 1986 over 5,500 workers were employed at the site, and were represented by the Oil, Chemical and Atomic Workers International Union (OCAW).

In 1986, the State of Colorado's Public Health Department, EPA, and DOE entered into a compliance agreement with the goal of bringing the facility into compliance with RCRA and Colorado Hazardous Waste Act permitting, generator, and waste management requirements. The agreement also initiated a process for investigating and remediating environmental contamination. In addition, the agreement established a framework addressing DOE's mixed-waste.

On August 10, 1987, 320 demonstrators were arrested after they tried to force a one-day shutdown of the Rocky Flats nuclear weapons plant.

In 1988, a Department of Energy (DOE) safety evaluation resulted in a report that was critical of safety measures at the plant. The EPA fined the plant for polychlorinated biphenyl (PCB) leaks from a transformer. A solid waste form, called pondcrete, was found not to have cured properly and was leaking from containers. A boxcar of transuranic waste from the site was refused entry into Idaho and returned to the plant. Plans to potentially close the plant were released.

In 1989 an employee left a faucet running, resulting in chromic acid being released into the sanitary water system. The Colorado Department of Health and the EPA both posted full-time personnel at the plant to monitor safety. Plutonium production was suspended due to safety violations.

In August 1989, an estimated 3,500 people turned out for a demonstration at Rocky Flats.

FBI/EPA investigation, June 1989 raid
In 1987, plant insiders started to covertly inform the Environmental Protection Agency (EPA) and the Federal Bureau of Investigation (FBI) about the unsafe conditions. In December 1988, the FBI commenced clandestine flights of light aircraft over the area and confirmed via infrared video recordings that the "outdated and unpermitted" Building 771 incinerator was apparently being used late into the night. After several months of collecting evidence both from workers and via direct measurement, the FBI informed the DOE on June 6, 1989 that they wanted to meet to discuss a potential terrorist threat.

On June 6, 1989, the United States District Court for the District Court of Colorado issued a search warrant to the FBI, based in part on information collected by Colorado Department of Health (now CDPHE) inspectors during the 1980s.

Dubbed "Operation Desert Glow", the raid, sponsored by the United States Department of Justice (DOJ), began at 9 a.m. on June 6, 1989. After arriving in the meeting room, the FBI agents revealed the true reason for the meeting to stunned DOE and Rockwell officials, including Dominic Sanchini, Rockwell International's manager of Rocky Flats. As it happens, Sanchini died the next year in Boulder of cancer. The FBI discovered numerous violations of federal anti-pollution laws, including limited contamination of water and soil. In 1992, Rockwell International was charged with environmental crimes, including violations of the Resource Conservation and Recovery Act (RCRA) and the Clean Water Act. Rockwell pleaded guilty and paid an $18.5 million fine. This was the largest fine for an environmental crime to that date.

After the June 1989 FBI raid, federal authorities used the subsequent grand jury investigation to gather evidence of wrongdoing and then sealed the record. In October 2006, DOE announced completion of the Rocky Flats cleanup without this information being available.

The FBI raid led to the formation of Colorado's first special grand jury in 1989, the juried testimony of 110 witnesses, reviews of 2,000 exhibits, and ultimately a 1992 plea agreement in which Rockwell admitted to 10 federal environmental crimes and agreed to pay $18.5 million in fines out of its own funds.  This amount was less than the company had been paid in bonuses for running the plant as determined by the Government Accounting Office (GAO), and yet was also by far the highest hazardous-waste fine ever; four times larger than the previous record.  Due to indemnification of nuclear contractors, without some form of settlement being arrived at between the U.S. Justice Department and Rockwell, the cost of paying any civil penalties would ultimately have been borne by U.S. taxpayers.  While any criminal penalties allotted to Rockwell would not have been covered, for its part Rockwell claimed that the Department of Energy had specifically exempted them from most environmental laws, including hazardous waste.

Regardless, and as forewarned by the prosecuting U.S. Attorney, Ken Fimberg/Scott, the Department of Justice's stated findings and plea agreement with Rockwell were heavily contested by its own, 23-member special grand jury.  Press leaks on both sides—members of the DOJ and the grand jury—occurred in violation of secrecy regarding grand jury information, a federal crime punishable by a prison sentence. The public contest led to U.S. Congressional oversight committee hearings chaired by Congressman Howard Wolpe, which issued subpoenas to DOJ principals despite several instances of DOJ's refusal to comply.  The hearings, whose findings include that the Justice Department had "bargained away the truth", ultimately still did not fully reveal to the public the special grand jury's report, which remains sealed by the DOJ courts.

The special grand jury report was nonetheless leaked to Westword.  According to its subsequent publications, the Rocky Flats special grand jury had compiled indictments charging three DOE officials and five Rockwell employees with environmental crimes. The grand jury also wrote a report, intended for the public's consumption per their charter, lambasting the conduct of DOE and Rocky Flats contractors for "engaging in a continuing campaign of distraction, deception and dishonesty" and noted that Rocky Flats, for many years, had discharged pollutants, hazardous materials and radioactive matter into nearby creeks and Broomfield's and Westminster's water supplies.

The DOE itself, in a study released in December of the year prior to the FBI raid, had called Rocky Flats' ground water the single greatest environmental hazard at any of its nuclear facilities.

Sealed grand jury records

Court records from the grand jury proceeding on Rocky Flats have been sealed for a number of years. The Federal Rules of Criminal Procedure, which govern federal grand jury proceedings, explicitly require grand jury proceedings to be kept secret unless otherwise provided by the Rules. Rocky Flats' secret grand jury proceedings were not unique.

However, some activists dispute the reasons for records confidentiality: Dr. LeRoy Moore, a Boulder theologian and peace activist; retired FBI Special Agent Jon Lipsky, who led the FBI's raid of the Rocky Flats plant to investigate illegal plutonium burning and other environmental crimes; and Wes McKinley, who was the foreman of the grand jury investigation into the operations at Rocky Flats (and served several terms as Colorado State Representative).

Former grand jury foreman McKinley chronicles his experiences in the 2004 book he co-authored with attorney Caron Balkany, The Ambushed Grand Jury, which begins with an open letter to the U.S. Congress from Special Agent Lipsky:

However, a former EPA employee and Jon Lipsky's partner disputes these claims: "Jon kind of went off the deep end," and "He started seeing conspiracy theories in everything."

1990s
Rockwell International was replaced by EG&G as primary contractor for the Rocky Flats plant. EG&G began an aggressive work safety and cleanup plan for the site that included construction of a system to remove contamination from the groundwater of the site. The Sierra Club vs. Rockwell case was decided in favor of the Sierra Club. The ruling directed Rocky Flats to manage plutonium residues as hazardous waste.

In 1991, an interagency agreement between DOE, the Colorado Department of Health, and the EPA outlined multiyear schedules for environmental restoration studies and remediation activities. DOE released a report that advocated downsizing the plant's production into a more streamlined facility. Due to the fall of the Soviet Union, production of most of the systems at Rocky Flats was no longer needed, leaving only the W88 warhead primary stages.

In 1992, due to an order by President G. H. W. Bush, production of submarine-based missiles using the W88 trigger was discontinued, leading to the layoff of 4,500 employees at the plant; 4,000 others were retained for long-term cleanup of the facility. The Rocky Flats Plant Transition Plan outlined the environmental restoration process. The DOE announced that  of plutonium lined the exhaust ductwork in six buildings on the site.

Starting in 1993, weapons-grade plutonium began to be shipped to the Oak Ridge National Laboratory, Los Alamos National Laboratory, and the Savannah River Site.

In 1994 the site was renamed the Rocky Flats Environmental Technology Site, reflecting the changed nature of the site from weapon production to environmental cleanup and restoration.

In 1998, the Colorado Department of Public Health and Environment's Cancer Registry conducted an independent study of cancer rates in areas around the Rocky Flats Site. Data showed no pattern of increased cancers tied to Rocky Flats.

Throughout the remainder of the 1990s and into the 2000s, cleanup of contaminated sites and dismantling of contaminated buildings continued with the waste materials being shipped to the Nevada Test Site, the Waste Isolation Pilot Plant in New Mexico, and the Envirocare company facility in Utah, which is now EnergySolutions.

2000s

In 2001, Congress passed the Rocky Flats National Wildlife Refuge Act. Surveys of the site reveal 630 species of vascular plants, 76% of which are native. Herds of elk are commonly seen on the site. However, the DOE retained the central area of the site, the Central Operable Unit.

The last contaminated building was removed and the last weapons-grade plutonium was shipped out in 2003, ending the cleanup based on a modified cleanup agreement. The modified agreement required a higher level of cleanup in the first  of soil in exchange for not having to remove any contamination below that point unless it posed a chance of migrating to the surface or contaminating the groundwater. About half of the 800 buildings previously existing on the site had been dismantled by early December 2004. By 2006, over 800 buildings had been decommissioned and demolished, with no buildings remaining. Today, the plant and all buildings are gone.

The site is contaminated with residual plutonium due to several industrial fires that occurred on the site and other inadvertent releases caused by wind at a waste storage area. The other major contaminant is carbon tetrachloride (CCl4). Both of these substances affected areas adjacent to the site. In addition, there were small releases of beryllium and tritium, as well as dioxin from incineration.

Cleanup was declared complete on October 13, 2005. About  of the original site, the former industrial area, remains under U.S. DOE Office of Legacy Management control for ongoing environmental monitoring and remediation. On March 14, 2007, DOE, EPA, and CDPHE entered into the Rocky Flats Legacy Management Agreement (RFLMA). The agreement establishes the regulatory framework for implementing the final remedy for the Rocky Flats site and ensuring the protection of human health and the environment.

In 2007, because the Peripheral Operable Unit was found to be suitable for unlimited use and unrestricted exposure, EPA posted public notice of its intent to delete this area (now largely the Rocky Flats National Wildlife Refuge) from the EPA's National Priorities List of CERCLA or "Superfund" sites. The Peripheral Operable Unit was subsequently removed from the National Priorities List.

2010s 
In September 2010, after a 20-year legal battle, the Tenth Circuit Court of Appeals reversed a $926 million award in a class-action lawsuit against Dow Chemical and Rockwell International.  The three-judge panel said that the jury reached its decision on faulty instructions that incorrectly stated the law. The appeals court tossed the jury verdict and sent the case back to the District Court.  According to the Appellate Court, the owners of 12,000 properties in the class-action area had not proved their properties were damaged or that they suffered bodily injury from plutonium that blew onto their properties.

In response to historic and ongoing reports of health issues by people who live and lived near Rocky Flats, an online health survey was launched in May 2016 by Metropolitan State University, Rocky Flats Downwinders, and other local universities and health agencies to survey thousands of Coloradans who lived east of the Rocky Flats plant while it was operational.

On May 19, 2016, a $375 million settlement was reached over claims by more than 15,000 nearby homeowners that plutonium releases from the plant risked their health and devalued their property. This settlement ended a 26-year legal battle between residents and the two corporations that ran the Rocky Flats Plant, Dow Chemical and Rockwell International, for the Department of Energy.

June 2014 marked a quarter century since the historic FBI and EPA raid of the Rocky Flats plant. A 3-day weekend of events from Friday, June 6 through Sunday, June 8 took place at the Arvada Center for the Arts, "Rocky Flats Then and Now: 25 Years After the Raid". Panel discussions covered various aspects of the Rocky Flats raid and its aftermath. On display were historical photographs and artifacts, as well as Rocky Flats-inspired art.

In 2016, the Colorado Department of Public Health and Environment's Cancer Registry completed a cancer incidence study that looked at the incidence of reported cancers in areas around Rocky Flats from 1990 to 2014. This study followed-up on and was modeled after CDPHE's original Rocky Flats cancer incidence study, which was completed in 1998. Ten cancers specifically linked to plutonium exposure and other cancers of concern to a Health Advisory Panel were assessed in 1998, and again in 2016. The study found "the incidence of all cancers-combined for both adults and children was no different in the communities surrounding Rocky Flats than would be expected based on cancer rates in the remainder of the Denver Metro area for 1990 to 2014."

In 2017, the CDPHE Cancer Registry completed a supplement to this study that specifically looked at the incidence of thyroid and rare cancers in neighborhoods around Rocky Flats. Cancer incidence data showed "no evidence of higher than expected frequencies of thyroid cancer" and "the incidence of 'rare' cancer was not higher than expected compared to the remainder of the Denver Metro area."

In 2018, Metropolitan State University of Denver declined to further participate in the Downwinders' health survey.

In January 2019, activist groups questioning the contamination risk assessment for the wildlife refuge filed a lawsuit to unseal documents from the grand jury investigation.

In response to concerned citizens reports about a breast cancer cluster in young women, CDPHE's Central Cancer Registry also examined the incidence of breast cancer in young women in communities around Rocky Flats. The Cancer Registry maintains a statewide database of all cancers diagnosed in Colorado residents (with some skin cancer exceptions). Hospitals, physicians, and laboratories are required by law to report medically-confirmed cancer data to CDPHE. In October 2019, CDPHE shared the Cancer Registry's findings. The Cancer Registry concluded, based on an analysis of the data, that "no increased incidence of breast cancer was found in young women in communities around Rocky Flats."

See also
 Atomic Energy Act
 Cold War
 Manhattan Project
 Price-Anderson Act
 Radioactive contamination from the Rocky Flats Plant
 Timeline of nuclear weapons development

Notes

External links

 U.S. Department of Energy, Legacy Management, Rocky Flats
 U.S. Environmental Protection Agency, Rocky Flats
 U.S. Fish & Wildlife Service, Rocky Flats Wildlife Refuge
 Colorado Department of Public Health & Environment (CDPHE), Rocky Flats
 Kristen Iversen
 Rocky Flats History
 Bomb Production at Rocky Flats: Death Downwind

 Photography: a year of disobedience
 Rocky Flats Cold War Museum
 RockyFlatsFacts
 Rocky Flats Collection at University of Colorado Boulder 
 University of Colorado Boulder Libraries resources
 [http://fullbodyburdenfilm.com/ Full Body Burden], forthcoming documentary

Further reading
 Doom with a View: Historical and Cultural Contexts of the Rocky Flats Nuclear Weapons Plant by Kristen Iversen (Chicago Review Press, 2020)
 Making a Real Killing: Rocky Flats and the Nuclear West by Len Ackland (University of New Mexico Press, 2002)

Annotated bibliography on Rocky Flats from the Alsos Digital Library for Nuclear Issues

 
Industrial buildings completed in 1956
Nuclear technology in the United States
Nuclear weapons infrastructure of the United States
Radioactive waste
Historic American Engineering Record in Colorado
Industrial buildings and structures on the National Register of Historic Places in Colorado
Military facilities on the National Register of Historic Places in Colorado
Historic districts on the National Register of Historic Places in Colorado
Buildings and structures in Jefferson County, Colorado
Manufacturing plants in the United States
United States Department of Energy facilities
Superfund sites in Colorado
Military installations in Colorado
Radioactively contaminated areas
Military research of the United States
National Register of Historic Places in Jefferson County, Colorado
1952 establishments in Colorado
1992 disestablishments in Colorado
Radiation accidents and incidents